Carol Creiniceanu (1 February 1939 – 14 January 2012) was a Romanian association football player. He was part of the Romanian team that reached quarterfinals at the 1964 Summer Olympics.

International career
Carol Creiniceanu played three games and scored one goals at international level for Romania, making his debut on 9 October 1963 when coach Silviu Ploeșteanu used him to replace Ion Haidu in the 32nd minute of a friendly which ended 0–0 against Turkey. His following game was also against Turkey, a 3–0 victory at the 1966 World Cup qualifiers in which he scored the final goal. His last game for the national team was a friendly which ended 1–1 against Yugoslavia. Creiniceanu also played 11 games and scored 4 goals for Romania's Olympic team, participating at the 1964 Summer Olympics in Tokyo where he scored two goals, one in a 3–1 victory against Mexico and one in a 4–2 victory against Ghana, helping the team finish in the 5th place.

Honours
Minerul Lupeni
Divizia B (1): 1958–59
Steaua București
Divizia A (1): 1967–68
Cupa României (6): 1961–62, 1965–66, 1966–67, 1968–69, 1969–70, 1970–71

Notes

References

1939 births
2012 deaths
People from Lupeni
Liga I players
Liga II players
CS Minerul Lupeni players
FC Steaua București players
Romanian footballers
Romania international footballers
Olympic footballers of Romania
Footballers at the 1964 Summer Olympics
Association football midfielders
Romanian football managers
CSM Jiul Petroșani managers